KaPPA-View4 is a metabolic pathway database containing data about metabolic regulation from 'omics' data.

See also
 Metabolic pathway

References

External links
 kazusa

Biological databases
Gene expression
Metabolism